Marie Lise Monique Émond  (14 November 193016 May 2020), better known as Monique Mercure, was a Canadian stage and screen actress. She was one of the country's great actors of the classical and modern repertory. In 1977, Mercure won a Cannes Film Festival Award and a Canadian Film Award for her performance in the drama film J.A. Martin Photographer.

Early life and education
Mercure was born Marie Lise Monique Émond in Montreal, Quebec, the daughter of Eugene and Yvonne (née Williams) Emond. Her parents enrolled her as a young child in diction, tap dancing, musical theory and cello classes. She married composer Pierre Mercure in 1949. The couple had three children; their daughter Michèle also worked as an actress, most notably in the films Kid Sentiment and A Scream from Silence (Mourir à tue-tête).

Mercure studied music and dance before studying theatre at St. Lawrence College, Ontario. In 1960 she held her first major role in replacing an actress in The Threepenny Opera.

Awards
At the 1977 Cannes Film Festival Mercure won the award for Best Actress for the film J.A. Martin Photographer. She won the Canadian Film Award for Best Actress at the 28th Canadian Film Awards for the same film that same year.

In 1978, she received a Canadian Film Award nomination for Best Supporting Actress at the 29th Canadian Film Awards for The Third Walker.

Mercure was made an Officer of the Order of Canada in 1977. She was subsequently promoted to Companion seventeen years later in 1994.

At the 4th Genie Awards in 1983, Mercure was a Best Actress nominee for Beyond Forty (La Quarantaine). She won a Genie Award for Best Supporting Actress in 1992 for her role as Fadela in Naked Lunch. In 1999, she won another Best Supporting Actress Genie for her role as Grace Gallagher in Conquest.

Mercure received the Governor General's Performing Arts Award for Lifetime Artistic Achievement, the Prix Denise Pelletier, and the Prix Gascon Roux du Théâtre du Nouveau Monde. The University of Toronto conferred an honorary doctorate on her in 1998. In 2006, she was made a Fellow of the Royal Society of Canada.

Death
Mercure died on 16 May 2020, at a palliative-care centre in Outremont, Montreal. She was 89, and had been suffering from throat cancer. News of her death was first announced by her daughter Michèle, who was at her bedside. Messages of condolence were conveyed by Canadian prime minister Justin Trudeau, Quebec premier François Legault, and Montreal mayor Valérie Plante. Trudeau praised Mercure for how she "helped promote Quebec cinema beyond our borders", adding that "her legacy will live on through her work".

Filmography

Film

Television

References

External links
 
 

1930 births
2020 deaths
Actresses from Montreal
Best Supporting Actress Genie and Canadian Screen Award winners
Canadian film actresses
Canadian television actresses
Place of death missing
Companions of the Order of Canada
Fellows of the Royal Society of Canada
French Quebecers
Cannes Film Festival Award for Best Actress winners
Prix Denise-Pelletier winners
Governor General's Performing Arts Award winners
Canadian stage actresses
Best Actress Genie and Canadian Screen Award winners